The 1997 Australian GT Production Car Championship was an Australian motor racing competition for Group 3E Series Production Cars. The championship, which was contested over an eight round series, was organised and administered by Procar Australia. It was recognised by the Confederation of Australian Motor Sport as the second Australian GT Production Car Championship.

The championship was won by  Peter Fitzgerald driving a Porsche 911 RSCS Type 993.

Schedule
The title was contested over an eight round series with two races per round.
 Round 1: Lakeside, Queensland, 4 May
 Round 2: Phillip Island, Victoria, 1 June
 Round 3: Calder Park, Victoria, 22 June
 Round 4: Amaroo Park, New South Wales, 20 July
 Round 5: Winton, Victoria, 10 August
 Round 6: Mallala Motor Sport Park, South Australia, 24 August
 Round 7: Lakeside, Queensland, 26 October
 Round 8: Amaroo Park, New South Wales, 9 November

Points system
Outright championship points were awarded on a 15-12-10-8-6-5-4-3-2-1 basis to the first ten finishers in each race.  An additional point was awarded to the driver setting the fastest qualifying lap for each race.  Class points were awarded on a 15-12-10-8-6-5-4-3-2-1 basis to the first ten finishers in each class in each race.

Championship standings

References

External links
 1997 Race Results Archive Retrieved from www.natsoft.biz on 19 November 2008

Australian GT Production Car Championship
GT Production Car Championship
Procar Australia